Laser Science and Technology Centre (LASTEC) is a laboratory of the Defence Research & Development Organization (DRDO). Located in Delhi, it is the main DRDO lab involved in the development of Lasers and related technologies. LASTEC functions under the DRDO Directorate of Electronics & Computer Science.

History 

LASTEC is the oldest laboratory in DRDO. It was established in 1950 as Defence Science Laboratory (DSL) which was a nucleus laboratory with the objective to conduct research in frontier areas of physics, chemistry and mathematics with a special focus on lasers and opto-electronics. On 9 April 1960, DSL was shifted to Metcalfe House and inaugurated by then Defence Minister V. K. Krishna Menon, in the presence of Pt. Jawaharlal Nehru. Its first Director was S. P. Chakravarti, the father of Electronics and Telecommunication engineering in India, who later founded LRDE, DRDL and DLRL.

With time, many of DSC activities were given to newly formed, specialized DRDO laboratories. DSL served as a precursor for as many as 15 present DRDO labs, including DRDL, SSPL, INMAS, FRL, ISSA, DESIDOC, DIFR, SAG, ITM etc.

In 1982, the Laboratory moved to a new technical building in Metcalfe House complex and was renamed as Defence Science Centre. The centre consolidated its R&D activities towards more specific and application oriented areas, such as liquid fuel technology, spectroscopy, crystallography, system engineering, biotechnology etc. DSL now started concentrating in the area of Pure Sciences such as Physics, Chemistry and Mathematics. The chemistry division developed G-fuel and UDMH for rockets and missiles. The Mathematics division conducted simulation and calculations related to the missile program, while the Physics division took the lead by launching many activities.

DSC was also given a new charter of duties with its major thrust on LASERS. Intensive work commenced on Solid-state lasers, Carbon dioxide lasers, ALARM, laser rangefinder, Fibre Optic Gyroscope, Ring laser gyroscopes, Laser Intruder Alarm systems, etc. In 1986, the centre was made responsible for the development of high power lasers for Defence applications as one of its major missions. The lab was renamed LASTEC on 1 Aug 1999 to emphasize its core focus of Laser technology. As of 2020, LASTEC is no longer functional or act as an independent laboratory. All the staff members are transferred to DRDO labs in Hyderabad.

Areas of Work 
LASTEC's primary focus is the research and development of various laser materials, components and laser systems, including High Power Lasers (HPL) for defence-applications. The main charter of the lab revolves around progressing in areas of Photonics, Electro-Optic Counter Measures (EOCM), low and High Power Lasers (HPL). LASTEC also develops and delivers directed energy weapon systems for the Indian Armed Forces, based on High-power laser technology.

As a defence technology spin off, LASTEC has also been engaged in the development of lasers for medical and other civilian applications.

Projects and Products 
In the field of high power laser LASTEC works in following field
1) Chemical oxygen iodine laser 2)Gas dynamic laser 3) Hf-Df laser

References

External links 
 
 

Research institutes in Delhi
Defence Research and Development Organisation laboratories
Research institutes established in 1950
Organisations based in Delhi
Laser awards and associations
1950 establishments in India
Research and development in India